Drunk means alcohol intoxication or a person suffering from it.

Drunk or Drunks may also refer to:

Music
 Drunk (album), a 2017 album by Thundercat
 Drunk, an album by Vic Chesnutt, 1993

 "Drunk" (Jimmy Liggins song), 1953
 "Drunk" (Ed Sheeran song), 2012
 "Drunk", a song by Kylie Minogue from Impossible Princess, 1997
 "Drunk", a song by Viola Beach from Viola Beach, 2016
 "Drunk", a song by Zayn from Mind of Mine, 2016
 "Drunk", a song by Schoolboy Q from Crash Talk, 2019
 "Drunk (And I Don't Wanna Go Home)" a song by Elle King and Miranda Lambert, 2021

Other uses
 Drunk, a main antagonist of Bubble Bobble
 Drunks (film), a 1995 film starring comedian Richard Lewis
 The Triumph of Bacchus, a 1628 painting by Diego Velázquez also referred to as The Drunks